Sir Francis William Lascelles KCB, MC (23 March 1890 – 16 May 1979) was a British public servant and Clerk of the Parliaments from 1953 to 1958.

A member of the Lascelles family headed by the Earl of Harewood, Lascelles was the son of Lieutenant-Colonel Henry Arthur Lascelles, son of William Lascelles. His mother was Caroline Maria Gore, daughter of the Honourable Charles Alexander Gore, Commissioner of Woods and Forests. He was educated at Winchester College and Christ Church, Oxford.
In the First World War he served in the Sussex Yeomanry, reaching the rank of Captain and being awarded the Military Cross.

He spent his subsequent career as a Clerk in the House of Lords. He became Clerk of Public Bills in 1925, holding that office until 1949. He was appointed a Companion of the Order of the Bath (CB) in 1937, and Reading Clerk in the same year. He was appointed Clerk Assistant in 1949, and Clerk of the Parliaments on 27 October 1953. He was appointed a Knight Commander of the Order of the Bath (KCB) in 1954 and retired at the end of 1958.

In 1924 he married Esmée Marion Bury. They had two sons. She died in 1995.

References 

Recipients of the Military Cross
Knights Commander of the Order of the Bath
People educated at Winchester College
Alumni of Christ Church, Oxford
1890 births
1979 deaths
Sussex Yeomanry officers
British Army personnel of World War I
Francis
Clerks of the Parliaments